The Jagbudi river is the small river merging into Vashishti river. It meets Vasishthi  near Bahirwali. It comes from Khed to Bahiravali. It Originates from Khopi in Ratnagiri district, Maharashtra, India.

Wildlife 
The type of crocodile that would inhabit this region of India is the mugger crocodile.

Settlements 
Apart from Khed and Bahirwali, settlements along the river include Shiv, Ashti, Karji, Kondivali, Savnas and Shirshi.

See also 
 Bhoste
 Khopi (Nepali village development committee)
 Konkan
 Konkan division
 List of rivers of India
 Western Ghats
 Wildlife of India

References 

Rivers of Maharashtra
Rivers of India
Rivers of the Western Ghats